Harald Seifert is an East German bobsledder who competed in the late 1970s. He won a gold medal in the four-man event at the 1978 FIBT World Championships in Lake Placid.

Seifert also finished fourth in the four-man event at the 1976 Winter Olympics in Innsbruck.

References
Bobsleigh four-man world championship medalists since 1930
Wallenchinsky, David (1984). "Bobsled: Four-man". In The Complete Book of the Olympics: 1896 - 1980. New York: Penguin Books. p. 561.

Living people
German male bobsledders
Olympic bobsledders of East Germany
Bobsledders at the 1976 Winter Olympics
Year of birth missing (living people)